Breathe (stylised as breathe) is the fifth studio album by American rock trio Tiny Moving Parts. It was released on September 13, 2019 through Hopeless Records.

Critical reception

Breathe was met with generally favorable reviews from critics. At Metacritic, which assigns a weighted average rating out of 100 to reviews from mainstream publications, this release received an average score of 79, based on 4 reviews.

Track listing

Charts

References

2019 albums
Hopeless Records albums
Albums produced by John Fields (record producer)